Oegwang-ri is an administrative division, or village, located in Onyang, Ulju County, Ulsan, South Korea. It is located west of the Busan-Ulsan expressway, just south of Samgwang-ri.

See also
South Korea portal

References

External links 
 Onyang district official web site 

Ulju County
Villages in South Korea